Podbeže is a village north of Podgrad in the Municipality of Ilirska Bistrica in the Inner Carniola region of Slovenia.

Mass graves
Podbeže is the site of a mass grave and an unmarked grave from the end of the Second World War. Both graves contain the remains of German soldiers from the 97th Corps that fell at the beginning of May 1945. It contains the remains of two soldiers. It contains the remains of one soldier.

Church
The local church in the settlement is dedicated to Mary Magdalene and belongs to the Parish of Hrušica.

References

External links

Podbeže on Geopedia

Populated places in the Municipality of Ilirska Bistrica